Widener University Commonwealth Law School (Widener Law Commonwealth) is a law school located in Harrisburg, Pennsylvania, and part of Widener University, a private university in Chester, Pennsylvania. It is one of two separate ABA-accredited law schools of the university. It was founded in 1989 as an expansion of Widener University's law school in Wilmington. It awards the Juris Doctor degree in its full-time and part-time programs and is a member of the Association of American Law Schools (AALS).

History 
The Widener University School of Law in Harrisburg was founded in 1989, as an expansion of Widener University's existing law school in Wilmington, Delaware. Anthony J. Santoro, who served as Dean of law from 1983 to 1992, felt that there was a need for legal education in Harrisburg, the capital city of the Commonwealth of Pennsylvania.
The law school became one of two law school campuses operated by Widener University.

On July 1, 2015, the two campuses separated into two distinct law schools that operate independently of each other, but remain part of the Widener University. Each law school has its own dean, faculty, students, curriculum, and accreditation. The first Dean of the renamed Widener University Commonwealth Law School in Harrisburg was Christian A. Johnson.  The law school chose the name Commonwealth to reflect its mission and ties to the Pennsylvania government and in recognition of Pennsylvania as one of four commonwealths in the nation.

Campus 
Located in Pennsylvania's capital of Harrisburg, the campus spans 19 acres and includes 4 academic and administrative buildings as well as recreation and parking areas. The law library houses significant regional legal collections.

Academics 
The school offers the Juris Doctor as well as certificate programs. It also offers two dual degree programs, a JD/Online Master of Business Administration with the Widener University School of Business Administration and a JD/Master of Library Science with Clarion University of Pennsylvania.

Central Pennsylvania Law Clinics 
Widener Law Commonwealth operates the Central Pennsylvania Law Clinics (CPLC) which provide legal services to the local community. The CPLC runs four clinics:
 Administrative Law Clinic
 Consumer Law Clinic
 Elder Law Clinic
 Family Justice Clinic

Dauphin County Bar Association 
Beginning in 2014, the law school created the a joint venture with the Dauphin County Bar Association, to create a legal incubator program. The program is housed within the Dauphin County Bar Association's office while Widener provides legal education and support. The program's mission is to allow new graduates the resources, space, and training needed to create new solo law firms which benefit the local community.

Bar pass rates 
Below are the Ultimate Bar Passage rates from the law school's ABA reports:
 2019 graduating class: 78.21%
 2018 graduating class: 90.00%
 2017 graduating class: 87.30%
 2016 graduating class: 95.65%
 2015 graduating class: 95.12%

Employment
According to the American Bar Association's Employment Reports, 83% of the law school's 2019 graduating class is employed in Pennsylvania and the largest employment type (20% of graduates) is state and federal judicial clerkships. In fall 2020, preLaw Magazine recognized Widener Law Commonwealth as the #1 school in their Employment Honor Roll.

Admissions 

For the 2021 entering class, the law school accepted 58.87% of applicants and 27.07% of those accepted enrolled, with enrolled students having an average LSAT score of 148 and an average undergraduate GPA of 3.20.

The law school offers several 3+3 early admissions programs with partner schools:
 Widener University 3+3 Early Admission Program
 Elizabethtown College Law Early Admission Program (LEAP)
 Cabrini University 3+3 Early Admission Program
 Wilson College 3+3 Early Admission Program
 Westminster College (Pennsylvania) 3+3 Early Admission Program

Notable alumni 
 Richard Alloway (2002) Pennsylvania State Senator;
 P. Kevin Brobson (1995) Justice of the Supreme Court of Pennsylvania;
 Mark B. Cohen (1993) Pennsylvania State Senator, Court of Common Pleas Judge;
 Beau Correll (2007) attorney and political commentator. Founder of Free the Delegates
 James H. Curry III (2009) Mayor of Middletown, Dauphin County, Pennsylvania
 Eugene DePasquale (2002) Auditor General of Pennsylvania;
 William P. Doyle (2000) former Commissioner of the Federal Maritime Commission.
 Michelle Henry (1994) Pennsylvania Attorney General
 Wayne Langerholc (2000) Pennsylvania State Senator for the 35th district
 Don McGahn (1994) White House Counsel, former commissioner of the Federal Election Commission;
 Mark S. McNaughton (2003) former Pennsylvania State Representative in the 104th District
 Patrick Murphy (1999) former member of the United States House of Representatives;
 Jim Schultz (1998) Associate White House Counsel.
 Doug Steinhardt Chair of the New Jersey Republican Party
 Thomas Russo (2015) Deputy Mayor of Howell, New Jersey
 Henry W. Van Eck (1998) Chief Judge of the US Bankruptcy Court, Middle District of Pennsylvania
 Alina Habba, one of Donald Trump's attorneys (as of 2023)

References

External links 
 Official website

Law schools in Pennsylvania
Harrisburg, Pennsylvania
Widener University
Universities and colleges in Harrisburg, Pennsylvania
Educational institutions established in 1989
1989 establishments in Pennsylvania